Boue may refer to:

 Boué, a commune in the Aisne department of France
 Ami Boué, Austrian geologist
 Anier Boué (born 1984), Cuban javelin thrower
 Stella Boué (1836–1925), French writer and feminist
 Valentine Boué (1898–1978), French writer and artist

See also
 
 Bouès, a tributary of the Arros in France